The Washington-Ireland Program for Service and Leadership (WIP) is a six-month program of personal and professional development that brings  university students from Northern Ireland and the Republic of Ireland to Washington, DC for summer internships and leadership training. The program begins and ends with practical service (usually some form of voluntary work in the NGO or political sectors) in Northern Ireland and the Republic of Ireland. It was originally called The Young Leaders Program.

In Washington, participants get first-hand experience with U.S. government and politics and an immersion in American culture by living with an area host family. Through an eight-week schedule, participants are encouraged to work and learn as a team and to create an environment of mutual respect. The program aims to send students home with enhanced professional and interpersonal skills and a new confidence in their own leadership abilities which they are expected to demonstrate through service to their own communities. Among the 2007 Internship opportunities were placements in the Senate offices of then Senators Barack Obama and Hillary Clinton.

Taoiseach Leo Varadkar was a member of the Class of 2000.

About the Program
Since its inception in 1995, the program has expanded from four to eight weeks, allowing time for both leadership training and work experience. Students are placed in offices across the Washington metropolitan region representing federal and local government, businesses, non-profit organizations, professional services firms and media organizations. Placements have included The White House, Congressional offices, The Northern Ireland Bureau, The World Bank, Habitat for Humanity, AFL-CIO, CNN and CBS, Library of Congress, Environmental Protection Agency, National Center for Missing and Exploited Children, The Justice Project, Imagination Stage and Solas Nua, among many others.

Participants develop practical leadership abilities by committing to 30 hours of service in their own communities before the summer and 40 hours in a Group Service Project when they return. Students also help launch and run the following year's program by assisting with marketing, recruiting, selecting and mentoring the succeeding WIP class.

Successful candidates must be Irish-born, or Irish or British (NI) citizens with current passports. They must be full-time students in Ireland or the United Kingdom, between the ages of 18 and 25, and passing their subjects at a better than passing grade.  Moreover, they must be willing to demonstrate leadership through service before and after the program, and be ready to participate in diverse leadership teams. Program applicants have represented more than 30 different universities in Northern Ireland, Ireland, England and Scotland.

To date, 300 young adults have graduated from the program. Many WIP graduates have moved into important careers in politics, business, media and education. These include: a research officer to the NI First Minister in Westminster; television and radio news journalists; reporters for major newspapers in Belfast and London; barristers and solicitors; university professors and primary school teachers; consultants with Accenture and PriceWaterhouseCoopers; Dublin PR firm managers; assistant to Members of the NI Assembly and the Irish Parliament; political party operatives in Northern Ireland and the Republic; and Executive Officer for the Home Office in London. Among the notable alumni is Taoiseach Leo Varadkar.

Initially begun in partnership with the Students' Union at Queen's University, Belfast, WIP has received support from the Irish Government through its Department of Education and the International Fund for Ireland as well as the UK government and the US State Department. The program is now actively developing partnerships with other government departments, universities, businesses, foundations and individuals that will support its core program and help expand alumni programs.

The Washington-Ireland Program is an extension of Project Children, a program that sponsors six-week summer holidays in the U.S. for young people from Northern Ireland. The participants, who stay with American Host Families, range in age from 10–14 years old and come from neighborhoods in which the Protestant-Catholic conflict has taken an especially heavy toll. For most children, these visits provide a first-time opportunity to get to know people from the other side of the sectarian divide. In its 27-year existence, Project Children has had 17,000 participants. Project Children also works with vocational trainees from Northern Ireland and the Republic who get on-site work experience in the U.S. by building homes with Habitat for Humanity.

In 2001, alumni members of the Washington-Ireland Programme established a charity known as the Youth Empowerment Scheme, a mentoring programme for children aged 11–14 years old from across Belfast. The aim of YES is to promote social inclusion of children from different ethnic, religious, educational and socio-economic backgrounds.

Notable alumni
 Leo Varadkar (Class of 2000), Fine Gael TD for Dublin West and Taoiseach (Head of Government) of Ireland since 14 June 2017.  Varadkar was elected as Leader of Fine Gael on 2 June 2017. First openly gay cabinet minister in Ireland and at 38, the youngest ever Taoiseach. 
 Chris Lyttle (Class of 2002), Alliance Party MLA for East Belfast.
 Emma Pengelly (Class of 2002), MP for Belfast South since June 2017,former Democratic Unionist Party MLA for Belfast South and Junior Minister in the Northern Ireland Executive.
 Noel Rock (Class of 2006), Fine Gael TD for Dublin North-West.
 Claire Sugden (Class of 2008), independent MLA for East Londonderry and former Justice Minister in the Northern Ireland Executive
 Patricia O'Lynn (Class of 2016), Alliance Party MLA for North Antrim since May 2022.

See also
VISTA
Internship
Study abroad

References and notes

External links
Official website
Official alumni website

Ireland–United States relations
Vocational education
Internship programs
Education in Ireland